Igwe (meaning "Sky"), 
is a royal title or method of addressing traditional rulers that control autonomous communities in Igboland. In other words, Igbos approximate the term to the HM style. An Igwe is therefore defined as a holder of a title of respect and honor in Igboland. Such a person is otherwise known as an Eze.
The foremost and one of the most respected  Igwe's in Igboland is Igwe of Nnewi, Igwe Kenneth Onyeneke Orizu III. 

Igwe is also invoked as the name of the Igbo Sky Father, the anthropomorphic personification of the heavens themselves.

Igwe is also used as a surname by many Igbos as well.

Notable people who make use of the word include:

Surname:
Amaechi Igwe (born 1988), American soccer player
Chioma Igwe (born 1986), American soccer player
Ekene Igwe (born 1988), Nigerian footballer
Leo Igwe (born 1970), Nigerian humanist and activist

Given name:
Igwe Aja-Nwachukwu (born 1952), Nigerian politician

Title:
Igwe Orizu I (Eze Ugbonyamba) (1881–1924), Nigerian monarch
Igwe Josiah Orizu II (1902–1962), Nigerian monarch
Igwe Kenneth Onyeneke Orizu III, Nigerian monarch

See also
Igwe language

Igbo words and phrases
Igbo culture
Igbo names
Igbo-language surnames